The 1996 SummerSlam was the ninth annual SummerSlam professional wrestling pay-per-view (PPV) event produced by the World Wrestling Federation (WWF, now WWE). It took place on August 18, 1996, at the Gund Arena in Cleveland, Ohio in the United States. Nine matches were contested at the event, including one match on the Free for All pre-show.

Background
SummerSlam is an annual pay-per-view (PPV), produced every summer by the World Wrestling Federation (WWF, now WWE) since 1988. Dubbed "The Biggest Party of the Summer," it is one of the promotion's original four pay-per-views, along with WrestleMania, the Royal Rumble and Survivor Series, and was considered one of the "Big Five" PPVs, along with King of the Ring. It has since become considered WWF's second biggest event of the year behind WrestleMania. The 1996 event was the ninth event in the SummerSlam chronology and was scheduled to be held on August 18, 1996, at the Gund Arena in Cleveland, Ohio.

Faarooq Asad had been scheduled to face Ahmed Johnson in a match for the WWF Intercontinental Championship at the event, but the match did not take place as Johnson was legitimately injured.

Event 
The opening bout, which aired on the "Free for All" portion of the broadcast, was a singles match between Stone Cold Steve Austin and Yokozuna. The match ended when the top rope broke as Yokozuna attempted a Banzai Drop (seated senton), enabling Austin to pin him for an upset victory.

Todd Pettengill hosted the "Bikini Beach Blast-Off" party during the Free for All, where a pool was set up for everyone. Guests included Sunny, Sable, Marc Mero, The Smoking Gunns, Marlena, Goldust, T.L. Hopper, Who, Jerry Lawler, The Bushwhackers, Aldo Montoya, Hunter Hearst Helmsley, and Shawn Michaels.

The second bout, and the first bout to air on the pay-per-view proper, was a singles match between Owen Hart and Savio Vega. During the match, Hart wore an orthopedic cast on his left arm. The match ended when Hart hit Vega with his cast then applied the Sharpshooter, defeating Vega by submission. Following the match, Justin Hawk Bradshaw attacked Vega.

The third bout saw WWF Tag Team Champions The Smoking Gunns defend their titles against The Bodydonnas, The Godwinns, and The New Rockers in a four-way elimination match. The Bodydonnas were the first team eliminated after Marty Jannetty tripped Zip, enabling Billy Gunn to pin him. The New Rockers were the next team eliminated when Henry O. Godwinn pinned Leif Cassidy following a Slop Drop (reverse DDT). The Smoking Gunns went on to win the match and retain their titles when Bart Gunn gave Phineas I. Godwinn a diving double axe handle, enabling Billy Gunn to pin him. Following the match, The Smoking Gunn's manager Sunny unveiled a large picture of herself.

The fourth bout was a singles match between The British Bulldog and Sycho Sid. Sid won the bout by pinning British Bulldog following a chokeslam and powerbomb.

The fifth bout was a singles match between Goldust and Marc Mero. Goldust won the bout by pinfall following a Curtain Call (lifting inverted DDT).

The sixth bout was a singles match between Jake "The Snake" Roberts and Jerry "The King" Lawler. Lawler won the bout by pinfall after hitting Roberts with a bottle of Jim Beam whiskey. Following the match, Lawler poured whisky onto Roberts until being stopped by Mark Henry.

The penultimate bout was the first ever Boiler Room Brawl, Mankind’s specialty match. The heel Mankind would be facing The Undertaker, whom Mankind had been harassing and assaulting at random for months. Mankind would often hang out in the darkness of an arena’s boiler room (also known as a mechanical room), which was often hot and dusty, and where most of the arena’s internal infrastructure was. This match first featured The Undertaker entering the Gund Arena’s boiler room to seek out his arch-enemy, but Mankind struck first and they then proceeded to brawl for 30 minutes in the boiler room, the arena’s corridors, the entrance ramp and finally the ring, where Paul Bearer was waiting for one of the wrestlers to take his urn, which was the winning objective of the match. Bearer turned on his long-time protege, The Undertaker, to align himself with Mankind.

The main event saw Shawn Michaels defend the WWF Championship against Vader. Vader originally won the match twice, first by countout (after he press-slammed Michaels onto the guard rail) and then by disqualification (when Michaels struck Vader repeatedly with Cornette's tennis racket), but because WWF championships can only change hands by pinfall or submission, Cornette demanded that the match restart both times. WWF President Gorilla Monsoon allowed this when Michaels agreed. Michaels went on to pin Vader after giving him Sweet Chin Music, thus retaining his title.

Aftermath

The main event feud between Shawn Michaels and Vader was supposed to continue until that year's Survivor Series event with Vader capturing the WWF Championship from the champion Michaels. However, due to several botches on the part of Vader during the match, Michaels voiced his frustrations about the match's execution to backstage where Vader was eventually stripped of his push. Michaels would eventually lose the title to Sycho Sid at Survivor Series.

Results

Other on-screen talent

References

External links 
 
 

1996 in Ohio
1996 WWF pay-per-view events
August 1996 events in the United States
Events in Cleveland
Professional wrestling in Cleveland
1996